The county governor of Vestland county in Norway represents the central government administration in the county.

The County Governor of Vestland is a position that was established on 1 January 2019 in preparation for the creation of the new Vestland county which was established on 1 January 2020 when the old Hordaland and Sogn og Fjordane counties were merged. The first county governor was Lars Sponheim who previously had served as the County Governor of Hordaland. The County Governor of Vestland is based at Leikanger, but will also have smaller annex offices located in Bergen and Førde.

The county governor is the government's representative in the county. The governor carries out the resolutions and guidelines of the Storting and government. This is done first by the county governor performing administrative tasks on behalf of the ministries. Secondly, the county governor also monitors the activities of the municipalities and is the appeal body for many types of municipal decisions.

Names
The title of the office was originally  but on 1 January 2021, the title was changed to the gender-neutral .

List of county governors
Vestland county has had the following governors:

See also
 List of county governors of Hordaland
 List of county governors of Sogn og Fjordane

References

Vestland
County Governor